Stéphane Debaere (born 1 January 1989) is a French Polynesian swimmer and model.

Debaere was born in Papeete. He began to swim in his home town then left at the age of 14 for metropolitan France, where he completed his secondary studies in Talence, Gironde.

At the 2007 South Pacific Games in Apia he won silver in the 50m Breaststroke, 4x100m Free Relay, 4x200m Free Relay, 4x200m Medley Relay, and 5K Open Water, and bronze in the 100m Breaststroke. At the 2015 Pacific Games in Port Moresby he won 3 gold and 4 silver medals.

In February 2016 he won the Tahiti Infos ATN Challenge. He subsequently organised the "Tahiti Swimming Experience" competition in October 2016. At the French Swimming Championships in 2016 he broked the French Polynesian record for the 100m freestyle.

References

Living people
1989 births
French Polynesian swimmers